Kenneth Wayne Lofton Jr. (born August 14, 2002) is an American professional basketball player for the Memphis Grizzlies of the National Basketball Association (NBA), on a two-way contract with the Memphis Hustle of the NBA G League. He played college basketball for the Louisiana Tech Bulldogs. He is a two-time all-conference selection in Conference USA, including first-team honors as a sophomore in 2022.

High school career
Lofton played basketball for Memorial High School in Port Arthur, Texas. He was initially a guard and became a post player following a growth spurt. He won a 5A state title in his sophomore season. As a senior, he averaged 17 points, 10 rebounds, and three assists per game, leading his team to a share of the 21–5A district title. Lofton earned 5A All-State honors and was a McDonald's All-American nominee. He signed a National Letter of Intent to play college basketball for Louisiana Tech.

College career
On March 28, 2021, Lofton recorded a freshman season-high 27 points and 13 rebounds, making a game-winning shot with 0.3 seconds left, in a 76–74 win over Colorado State at the National Invitational Tournament (NIT) third place game. He was an All-Tournament Team selection. As a freshman, Lofton averaged 12.2 points and 7.5 rebounds per game, earning Third Team All-Conference USA and Freshman of the Year honors. He was named Conference USA Freshman of the Week nine times, tied for the third-most in league history. Lofton was the first Louisiana Tech freshman to lead the team in rebounding since Paul Millsap in 2003–04.

As a sophomore, Lofton was named to the First Team All-Conference USA. He averaged 16.5 points, 10.5 rebounds, and 2.8 assists per game. On March 22, 2022, Lofton declared for the 2022 NBA draft. He did not sign with an agent, allowing him the flexibility to return to Louisiana Tech.

Professional career

Memphis Grizzlies (2022–present) 
After going undrafted in the 2022 NBA draft, Lofton signed a two-way contract with the Memphis Grizzlies on July 2, 2022. He made his NBA debut on October 22, 2022, scoring four points in a 137–96 loss to the Dallas Mavericks. Lofton was named to the G League's inaugural Next Up Game, the league's version of the NBA All-Star Game, for the 2022–23 season.

National team career
Lofton represented the United States at the 2021 FIBA Under-19 World Cup in Latvia. He averaged 13.1 points and 5.3 rebounds per game, helping his team win the gold medal. Lofton scored 16 points, including 15 in the second half, in an 83–81 win against France in the final.

Career statistics

College

|-
| style="text-align:left;"| 2020–21
| style="text-align:left;"| Louisiana Tech
| 32 || 28 || 22.8 || .567 || – || .596 || 7.5 || 1.5 || 1.0 || .7 || 12.2
|-
| style="text-align:left;"| 2021–22
| style="text-align:left;"| Louisiana Tech
| 33 || 33 || 27.0 || .539 || .200 || .672 || 10.5 || 2.8 || 1.2 || .7 || 16.5
|- class="sortbottom"
| style="text-align:center;" colspan="2"| Career
| 65 || 61 || 24.9 || .550 || .200 || .637 || 9.0 || 2.1 || 1.1 || .7 || 14.3

Personal life
Lofton's father, also named Kenneth, served in the United States Army, worked in the United States Postal Service for 18 years and was elected to the Port Arthur Independent School District board of trustees. His older sister, Kennedi, played college basketball for Southern. His grandfather, Gene "Rock" Duhon, was a track and field athlete at Southern University, where he was named to the Track Hall of Fame, and competed at United States Olympic Trials.

References

External links
Louisiana Tech Bulldogs bio
USA Basketball bio

2002 births
Living people
American men's basketball players
Basketball players from Texas
Louisiana Tech Bulldogs basketball players
Memphis Grizzlies players
Power forwards (basketball)
Sportspeople from Port Arthur, Texas
Undrafted National Basketball Association players